Corus breuningi is a species of beetle in the family Cerambycidae. It was described by Lepesme in 1943.

References

breuningi
Beetles described in 1943